This is a list of LGBT organizations affiliated with political parties. For groups whose primary purpose is campaigning for the legal rights of LGBT people, please see List of LGBT rights organizations.

France
 GayLib (Union for a Popular Movement)
 Homosexualités et Socialisme (Socialist Party)

New Zealand
 Rainbow Labour (New Zealand Labour Party)

The Philippines
 Ladlad

Sweden
 Open Moderates (Moderate Party)

United Kingdom
 LGBT+ Conservatives (Conservative Party)
 LGBT+ Liberal Democrats (Liberal Democrats)
 LGBT+ Labour (Labour Party)

United States
 Alice B. Toklas LGBT Democratic Club (Democratic Party)
 GOProud (Republican Party)
 Harvey Milk Lesbian, Gay, Bisexual, Transgender Democratic Club (Democratic Party)
 Log Cabin Republicans (Republican Party)
 National Socialist League
 National Stonewall Democrats (Democratic Party)
 Republican Unity Coalition (Republican Party)

LGBT political organizations
political parties